Listen Closely is the second album of Christian rock band Smalltown Poets. It was released in 1998.

Track listing
 "Call Me Christian" – 3:36
 "Anything Genuine" – 3:05
 "There Is Only You" – 3:47
 "Gloria" – 3:10
 "48 States" – 3:46
 "Long Long Way" – 4:04
 "The Gospel Is Peace" – 4:29
 "Hold It up to the Light" – 4:15
 "New Man" – 4:58
 "Quasar" – 3:19
 "Garland of Grace" – 3:49
 "One of These Days" – 2:16

Personnel
Michael Johnston – vocals, guitars
Miguel DeJesús – bass guitar
Kevin Breuner – lead guitar
Danny Stephens – keyboards, vocals
Byron Goggin – drums, percussion

Smalltown Poets albums
1998 albums